The women's 400 metres hurdles at the 1998 European Athletics Championships was held at the Népstadion on 19 and 21 August.

Medalists

Results

Round 1
Qualification: First 2 in each heat (Q) and the next 2 fastest (q) advance to the Final.

Final

References

Results
Results
Results

Hurdles 400
400 metres hurdles at the European Athletics Championships
1998 in women's athletics